Suzanne Anton,  (born May 31, 1952) is a Canadian politician and the former Minister of Justice and Attorney General of British Columbia. Elected to the Legislative Assembly of British Columbia in the 2013 provincial election, Anton represented the riding of Vancouver-Fraserview as a member of the British Columbia Liberal Party, following a career at the municipal level. She was appointed British Columbia's Attorney General and Minister of Justice on June 10, 2013.

Prior to her political involvement, Anton was a lawyer and former prosecutor with the Criminal Justice Branch of British Columbia. She was defeated in the 2017 provincial election by George Chow.

Anton sought official status to lead the "no" side opposing any electoral reform in BC with Bill Tieleman and Bob Plecas.

Attorney General of British Columbia

Crime Victim Assistance Program
Anton has made public statements in regards to the murder of Maple Batalia, a Simon Fraser University student murdered in 2011, whose alleged murderer has been charged but still not tried as of 2015. The trial is expected to resume in January 2016.

Anton has stated that the pre-trial delay must be very difficult for to the Batalia family.  She said the British Columbia government is committed to supporting families through the Crime Victim Assistance Program which provides financial benefits to help people recover from the impacts of victimization. She said that Crown counsel do their best to advance cases promptly and provide the accused with a fair and timely trial.

Background
Born in Duncan, British Columbia, Anton graduated from Queen Margaret's School in 1970 and went on to receive her Bachelor of Science in mathematics from the University of Victoria.  She went on to complete her Bachelor of Law from the University of British Columbia in 1979.

Prior to her career in politics, Suzanne Anton was a mathematics teacher at the Carlucci American International School of Lisbon in Portugal, and through Canadian University Service Overseas in Nigeria.  She was also a Crown Counsel lawyer. She served with many organizations including the Vancouver Sport Tourism Task Force; MoreSports (founding member); ARKS (Arbutus Ridge Kerrisdale Shaughnessy) CityPlan Visioning community liaison group; Vancouver City Planning Commission; Rick Hansen Wheels in Motion Vancouver event; Kerrisdale Soccer Club (past president); Vancouver Field Sport Federation (past vice-president); Achilles Track Society; and Riley Park community association.

Vancouver City Council

In 2002, Anton was elected to the Vancouver Park Board and served a single term. In 2005, Anton was elected to Vancouver City Council in 2005, to which she was re-elected in 2008. During that time, Anton served on the Board of Directors for the B.C. Pavilion Corporation (PavCo), the Vancouver Symphony Orchestra, the BC Sports Hall of Fame, the 2011 Grey Cup committee and the Vancouver 125 committee.

While in municipal government, Anton served as the Vancouver director for the Federation of Canadian Municipalities, where she was the vice chair of the committee to Increase Women's Participation in Municipal Government and sat on the Governance Review Committee. As a Director of Metro Vancouver, Anton was a member of the Waste Management Committee, the Land Use and Transportation Committee, and the UBC/Metro Vancouver joint committee. Anton served as the Vancouver director on Translink during the initial construction of the Canada Line. While there, she also served on the audit committee. Anton has served on numerous community and sport boards.

In addition to this, Anton served as the vice-chair of the city's Planning and Environment Committee and a member of the Heritage Commission. At the Metro Vancouver level, she was a member of the Land Use and Transportation Committee and the Vancouver/UBC Joint Committee, where she was the lead on the issue of University of British Columbia governance.

In Vancouver's 2011 municipal election, Anton was the Non-Partisan Association's candidate for Mayor of Vancouver, eventually losing to incumbent Gregor Robertson of Vision Vancouver.

In her time on Vancouver City Council, Anton has also sat on the boards of TransLink, Metro Vancouver, and the Federation of Canadian Municipalities. She has been vice-chair of the city's Planning and Environment Committee and a member of the Heritage Commission. At the Metro Vancouver level, she was a member of the Land Use and Transportation Committee and the Vancouver/UBC Joint Committee, where she was the lead on the issue of University of British Columbia governance.

Personal life
Anton and her husband Olin have three adult children named Elizabeth, Robert and Angus.

Electoral record 

2011 Vancouver Mayoral Election

2008 Vancouver Municipal Election - City Council

2005 Vancouver Municipal Election - City Council

References

External links
 Suzanne Anton

British Columbia Liberal Party MLAs
Canadian King's Counsel
Women government ministers of Canada
Canadian schoolteachers
Women municipal councillors in Canada
Lawyers in British Columbia
Living people
People from Duncan, British Columbia
University of Victoria alumni
Non-Partisan Association councillors
Women MLAs in British Columbia
Attorneys General of British Columbia
1952 births
Peter A. Allard School of Law alumni
21st-century Canadian politicians
21st-century Canadian women politicians